Scrobipalpa biljurshi is a moth in the family Gelechiidae. It was described by Povolný in 1980. It is found in Saudi Arabia.

References

Scrobipalpa
Moths described in 1980